Miss America 2012, the 85th Miss America pageant, was held at the Theatre for the Performing Arts of Planet Hollywood Resort and Casino on the Las Vegas Strip in Paradise, Nevada on Saturday, January 14, 2012. Miss America 2011, Teresa Scanlan from Nebraska, crowned her successor Laura Kaeppeler from Wisconsin at the end of this event. It was broadcast live on ABC. All 50 states plus the District of Columbia, Virgin Islands, and Puerto Rico competed for the title.

Chris Harrison and Brooke Burke, for the second year in a row, hosted the pageant.

Results

Placements

* - America's Choice

** - Saved by eliminated delegates after Swimsuit Competition to compete in Evening Gown as a "wild card"

Order of announcements

Top 15

Top 13

Top 10

Top 5

Awards

Preliminary awards

Quality of Life award

Duke of Edinburgh awards

Other awards

Judges
The seven judges for the competition were:
 dancer and musician Mark Ballas
 television personality Raúl De Molina
 television producer Mike Fleiss
 television personality Kris Jenner
 actress Teri Polo
 personal trainer Chris Powell
 television personality Lara Spencer

Delegates

Replacements
 Montana - Veronika Ohlinger was originally the 1st runner-up but later was crowned Miss Montana 2011 to replace the original winner Taryn Chuter, who resigned due to a knee injury that required surgery.

References

External links
 Miss America 2012
 Miss America official website

2012
2012 beauty pageants
2012 in Nevada
Zappos Theater
January 2012 events in the United States